Colin Battye (1936 – April 2018) was an English professional rugby league footballer who played in the 1950s and 1960s.

Background
Colin Battye's birth was registered in Pontefract district, West Riding of Yorkshire in 1936, and he died aged 82 in April 2018.

Playing career

County League appearances
Colin Battye played in Castleford's victory in the Yorkshire county league during the 1964–65 season.

BBC2 Floodlit Trophy Final appearances
Colin Battye played , i.e. number 2, in Castleford's 4-0 victory over St. Helens in the 1965 BBC2 Floodlit Trophy Final during the 1965–66 season at Knowsley Road, St. Helens on Tuesday 14 December 1965.

Genealogical information
Colin Battye was the younger brother of Derek Battye, and Barbara Battye, and the older brother of the rugby league footballer; Malcolm Battye.

References

External links
Search for "Battye" at rugbyleagueproject.org
Colin Battye Memory Box Search at archive.castigersheritage.com

1936 births
2018 deaths
Castleford Tigers players
English rugby league players
Rugby league players from Pontefract
Rugby league wingers